Senior Chief Petty Officer (SCPO) is an enlisted rank in the navies of some countries.

United States

U.S. Coast Guardsenior chiefpetty officercollar device

U.S. Coast Guardsenior chiefpetty officerinsignia

Senior chiefpetty officercollar device

Senior chiefpetty officershoulderboard

Senior chiefpetty officerwith 12 yearsof service

Senior chiefpetty officerinsignia

Senior chief petty officer is the eighth of nine enlisted rates in the U.S. Navy and U.S. Coast Guard, just above chief petty officer and below master chief petty officer, and is a noncommissioned officer.  They are addressed as "Senior Chief" in most circumstances, or sometimes, less formally, as "Senior".

Advancement to senior chief petty officer is similar to that of chief petty officer. It carries requirements of time in service, superior evaluation scores, and peer review. In the Navy, it is the first promotion that is based entirely on proven leadership performance; test scores do not play a part. A chief petty officer can only advance to senior chief if a board of master chiefs approve, convened every year around March. Senior chief petty officers make up just 2.5% of the total enlisted force of the Navy and overall fall within the top 4% of the enlisted ranks.

In the Coast Guard, advancement to senior chief is similar to other advancements, in that candidates compete with other advancement-eligible chief petty officers.  Advancement-eligible chief petty officers are prioritized based on written examination scores, evaluations, award points, time in service, and time in grade.  Senior chief petty officers are then selected monthly from this prioritization list as positions become available.

As do chief petty officers, senior chief petty officers take on more advanced leadership duties in their new paygrade. In the Navy, their khaki uniform continues to reflect their responsibility level: It is similar to an officer's uniform, but with different insignia.  (In the Coast Guard, petty officers, chief petty officers, warrant officers, and commissioned officers all wear similar uniforms.)

Like petty officers, every chief has both a rate (rank) and rating (job, similar to an MOS in other branches). A chief's full title is a combination of the two. Thus, a senior chief petty officer with the rating of machinist's mate would properly be called a senior chief machinist's mate, the abbreviation of which is MMCS.

Each rating has an official abbreviation, such as MM for machinist's mate, QM for quartermaster, and YN for yeoman.  The rating and the rate combined give the abbreviation of a senior chief's full title, such as BMCS for senior chief boatswain's mate. In the expanded form, the title of senior chief always precedes the rating. It is not uncommon practice to refer to a senior chief petty officer by this shorthand in all but the most formal correspondence (such as printing and inscription on awards).

The rating insignia for a senior chief is an eagle with spread wings above three chevrons. The chevrons are topped by a rocker that goes behind the eagle (or "crow", as it is commonly called). An inverted star (similar to the stars on the sleeves of line officers) is above the eagle. This is used on the dress blue uniform. On all other uniforms, the insignia used is the one that has become universally accepted as the symbol of the chief petty officer: a fouled (entwined in the anchor chain) gold anchor superimposed with a silver "USN" in the Navy or a silver shield in the Coast Guard. As in the dress blue insignia, the anchor is capped by an down-pointing star.

In the Navy, officers and chiefs are referred to as "khakis". This is a reference to the color of one of their most common uniforms and is a direct contrast to those in paygrades E-6 and below ("blueshirts").

Command senior chief petty officer

As of 2005 and after a pilot program taking place on three mine countermeasures ships, the Navy started appointing senior chiefs to command roles. Until this time, senior chiefs had a senior enlisted leadership role in the submarine force as chiefs of the boat. This new effort works to formalize leadership at the senior chief level. In July 2015, the rate was formally established as a rating. Before it had been a billet instead of a rating.

The USCG also has the grade of Command Senior Chief Petty Officer (Silver Badge).

Ireland

Irish Naval Service
Senior chief petty officer (Irish: Ard-Mhion-Oifigeach Sinsearach) is a rank in the Irish Naval Service. The rank is deemed equivalent to a member of the NATO armed forces ranked E-8, making it the equivalent of a senior chief petty officer in the US Navy or a warrant officer class 2 in the Royal Navy. The rank is one grade below an Irish warrant officer.

The SCPO rank being the equivalent to Battalion or Regimental Quartermaster Sergeant causes some confusion when operating together with the Irish Army and Air Corps. The Quartermaster or logistical function is primary role of all BQMS/RQMS (OR-8) in the Irish Army and Air Corps. This is not so with the Irish Naval Service, many of their SCPOs (OR-8) have a purely line role. Line being the term used by the Irish Defence Forces to describe the default military role or non logistical role of the NCO.

All SCPOs have a specialist role such as Seaman, Engine Room Artificer, or Logistical Operator. There are only a very few Senior Chiefs, and they occupy roles of great importance within their respective branches. They are key members of the senior enlisted leadership, and are most often working directly for an Officer Commanding a large sub-unit as an advisor to Officer  Commanding and as a senior personnel manager.

References

See also
 Petty officer
 U.S. Navy enlisted rate insignia
 Comparative military ranks

Military ranks of the United States Navy
Military ranks of the United States Coast Guard
United States military enlisted ranks